Michael France was a film screenwriter.

Michael France may also refer to:

 Michael Paul France (born 1968), British footballer
 Mike France (politician) (born 1962), member of the Connecticut House of Representatives

See also
 Michael Francis (disambiguation)
 Michael French (disambiguation)